Fay Lemport (born c. 1901) was an American actress known for her role in Daddy-Long-Legs (1919). She appeared in three films between 1919 and 1920.

A 1919 article said that she had received 39 marriage proposals in one month. After receiving so many proposals she took a brief refuge in the study of psychoanalysis.

Selected filmography
The Heart of Youth (1919)
Daddy-Long-Legs (1919)
Save Me, Sadie (1920) (short)
Huckleberry Finn (1920)

References

External links

Year of birth missing
Year of death missing
American film actresses
American silent film actresses
20th-century American actresses